Today My Way may refer to:

Today My Way (Nancy Wilson album) 1965
Today My Way (Patti Page album) 1967
Today My Way, album by Oliver Nelson 1964
Today My Way, album by Roger Williams (pianist) 1983